Bayram Bektaş (born 10 February 1974) is a UEFA Pro Licensed Turkish football manager and former footballer. He is best known for his spell at Turkish side Beşiktaş. Used to play at midfield, Bektaş was able to adapt to attacking midfield or winger positions during his professional career. Bektaş was a part of Beşiktaş. squad winning Süper Lig title in centenary year of the club.

Career
Following his retirement, Bektaş worked at Bucaspor, Eskişehirspor, Elazığspor, Gaziantepspor between 2010 and 2013, appointed as assistant manager. He served under Bülent Uygun as assistant manager at Eskişehirspor and Gaziantepspor. Duo later joined Qatari side Umm Salal SC in 2014. Bektaş began his managerial career with TFF First League side Elazığspor in 2015 and he left after few months. Bektaş joined Büyükşehir Gaziantepspor the same season and finished the TFF First League in 8th position and he left after in the end of season. The following season he return to his first managerial club to Elazığspor in 2016 and finished the season in 10th position. In 2017 Bektaş asked to leave the club, then joined another TFF First League team Ümraniyespor. Bektaş immediately aided the team in achieving promotion Playoffs but Ümraniyespor lose two games with score 4–3 and 2–1 and failed promotion to Süper Lig. On 23 May 2017, Bektaş was appointed the Süper Lig side Göztepe for 1+1 years.

On 19 December 2018, Bektaş was appointed as the manager of MKE Ankaragücü. But after less than a month, he parted his ways with the club.

Honours
Beşiktaş
Süper Lig (1): 2002–03
Sarıyer
1. Lig (1): 1995–96

Personal life
Due to spending youth years on French side AJ Auxerre, Bektaş is fluent in French language. Bektaş is married with one child.

References

External links
 Profile at TFF 

1974 births
Sportspeople from Trabzon
Turkish football managers
Association football midfielders
Süper Lig players
Sarıyer S.K. footballers
Antalyaspor footballers
Altay S.K. footballers
Beşiktaş J.K. footballers
Trabzonspor footballers
Konyaspor footballers
Kocaelispor footballers
Living people
Turkish footballers
Elazığspor managers
Göztepe S.K. managers
MKE Ankaragücü managers
Kayserispor managers
Ümraniyespor managers
Samsunspor managers